Bree Masters (born 24 June 1995) is an Australian sprinter. Formally a beach sprint Australian and World Champion, Masters crossed from sand to track in 2019. In just under 3 years, she qualified for the 100m at the 2022 Oregon World Athletics Championships being just the third Australian female in more than two decades to compete in the blue-ribbon event at the World Championships. In the same year, she was selected for the 2022 Birmingham Commonwealth Games in the 100m and 4x100m.

Biography 

Originally from Sydney, Bree begun her sprinting career in Surf Life Saving. In 2013, she moved to Queensland to pursue her sport professionally. Over the years, Bree has taken the Surf Life Saving world by storm, becoming a multiple time beach sprint and flag medalist at State, Australian and World Championship levels.

Bree switched lanes in 2019, and crossed her focus to track and field, competing in the 100m, 200m and 4x100m relay events. In under three years in the sport, Bree has achieved silver in the 100m at the 2021 and 2022 Australian Track and Field Titles and currently holds personal best times of 11.29s (100m) and 23.21s (200m). Within this time, Bree also qualified for the 100m at the 2022 Oregon World Athletics Championships being just the third Australian female in more than two decades to compete in the blue-ribbon event at the World Championships. Masters ran a personal best of 11.29s at the 2022 World Athletics Championships in Eugene, Oregon. She placed fourth in her heat and missed out on qualifying for the semi-finals.

In the same year, she was selected for the 2022 Birmingham Commonwealth Games in the 100m and 4x100m, placing 13th in the 100m and 4th in the 4x100m. Bree is also apart of the second, third and fourth fastest Australian 4x100m relay of all time. 

In 2022, Masters also competed at the 2022 Oceania Athletics Championships in Mackay, North Queensland. She was runner-up in the 100 meters event and third in the 200 meters event.

Results representing Australia

Personal bests

References

External links 

 Bree Masters at Athletics Australia
 Bree Masters at World Athletics

1995 births
Living people
World Athletics Championships athletes for Australia
Australian female sprinters
21st-century Australian women
Athletes (track and field) at the 2022 Commonwealth Games
Commonwealth Games competitors for Australia